Jeon Sang-Wook  (born September 22, 1979) is a current Seongnam FC football coach and a former South Korean football player who played for Seongnam FC as a goalkeeper. (formerly National League side Ulsan Hyundai Mipo Dockyard and Busan I'Park).

Club career 
He retired from playing career due to Nasopharynx cancer. His last professional game was for Seongnam FC on 1 May 2016. He was already suffered much then but Seongnam FC let him play for 3 minutes extra time to let him say goodbye to the fans.

Managerial career
On 7 February 2017, he announced the recovery from the cancer and Seongnam FC appointed him as an Under 10s Youth Team Coach.

References

External links

1979 births
Living people
South Korean footballers
Dankook University alumni
Seongnam FC players
Busan IPark players
Korea National League players
K League 1 players
Association football goalkeepers